The 1979 World Table Tennis Championships women's singles was the 35th edition of the women's singles championship.
Ge Xin'ai defeated Li Song Suk in the final by three sets to nil, to win the title.

Results

See also
 List of World Table Tennis Championships medalists

References

-
1979 in women's table tennis